Clifton is a closed railway station on the South Coast railway line in New South Wales, Australia. The station opened on 25 July 1888 and closed on 15 August 1915.

References

Disused regional railway stations in New South Wales
Railway stations in Australia opened in 1888
Railway stations closed in 1915